Adrian Mannarino was the defending champion, but did not participate this year.

Evgeny Donskoy won the tournament, defeating Marco Chiudinelli in the final, 7–6(7–2), 6–3.

Seeds

Draw

Finals

Top half

Bottom half

External links
 Main Draw
 Qualifying Draw

Open Castilla y Leon - Singles
2015
2015 Open Castilla y León